Achal Surinder "Boney" Kapoor (born 11 November 1955) is an Indian producer primarily associated with Hindi cinema in addition to Tamil and Telugu cinema.

Early life
Kapoor was born as Achal Surinder Kapoor in 1955, the son of Surinder Kapoor who was a Bollywood film producer, and Nirmal Kapoor. His younger brothers Anil and Sanjay are both actors and producers.

Career
Kapoor started his career working under legends like Shakti Samanta. The most famous film produced by him remains the Shekhar Kapur directed sci-fi film Mr India starring his brother Anil Kapoor and his future wife Sridevi. It was the second biggest hit of 1987 and remains a cult classic in India. The film was known for several of its lines and songs, including Sridevi's "Miss Hawa Hawaii" performance and Amrish Puri's quote "Mogambo khush hua" (Mogambo is satisfied), which is one of the most famous quotes of Bollywood and has become synonymous with Puri.

Laxmikant–Pyarelal's music performed well too, especially the song "Hawa Hawaii" which is very popular till today. Mr India has often been featured in lists of top Bollywood films. Indiatimes Movies ranks the movie amongst the Top 25 Must See Bollywood Films. This was the last film that the duo Salim-Javed wrote together. They had split up earlier in 1982, but came back for one last film. It was remade in Tamil as En Rathathin Rathame, starring K. Bhagyaraj. in Kannada as Jai Karnataka, starring Ambareesh. On the centenary of Indian cinema, Mr. India was declared one of the 100 Greatest Indian Films of All Time. Described by Rediff as "one of the most iconic films of its time", it became one of the highest grossing hits of 1987. and also found a place in Hindustan Times list of 'Top 10 Patriotic Films of Hindi Cinema'.

His other early productions include Hum Paanch which played a key role in establishing actors like Mithun Chakraborty and Amrish Puri in Bollywood. Kapoor also launched many big stars of the Hindi film industry. His production Woh Saat Din launched brother Anil Kapoor, Prem launched younger brother Sanjay Kapoor and Tabu, and Koi Mere Dil Se Poochhe launched actress Esha Deol. He produced one of the most expensive films in the history of Hindi cinema: Roop Ki Rani Choron Ka Raja in 1993. In 1997, he produced the box office hit Judaai starring Sridevi and Anil together yet again with Urmila Matondkar.

Kapoor was managing brother Anil's career well until 1999 and in 2000 he produced Pukar starring Anil, Madhuri Dixit, Namrata Shirodkar, Danny Denzongpa and Om Puri. The film was critically acclaimed and a moderate success at the box office. It won two National Film Awards, including the Nargis Dutt Award for Best Feature Film on National Integration and the National Film Award for Best Actor for Anil Kapoor's performance.

In 2002, he produced Company directed by Ram Gopal Varma starring Ajay Devgan, Mohanlal, Manisha Koirala, Vivek Oberoi, and Antara Mali. It is a fictional exposé of the Mumbai underworld, loosely based on the Indian mafia organisation D-Company, known to be run by Dawood Ibrahim. The film received positive reviews from critics as well as audience and won six out of the eleven awards it was nominated for at the Filmfare Awards. The film received critical acclaim at the 2004 Austin Film Festival and New York Asian Film Festival.

It is the second film in the Gangster series and a sequel to the film Satya. It was followed by a sequel, D. Film critic Rajeev Masand has labelled it (along with its prequel Satya) one of the "most influential movies of the past ten years." Company marked the introduction of a new genre of film making, a variation of film noir that has been called Mumbai noir.

His 2004 film Run starring Abhishek Bachchan was a box office failure but has since achieved a cult status for its comedy scenes, especially the "Kauwa Biryani" scene starring Vijay Raaz. Following this, he produced the comedy film No Entry that became Bollywood's biggest hit of 2005. It gained a lot of popularity grossing INR .

In 2009, Kapoor produced Wanted starring Salman Khan. The film broke many records at the box office upon release, due to Khan's comeback. Wanted was the second highest-grossing Bollywood film of 2009. It had an excellent opening, grossing Rs. 440 million in the first week. It shattered records in Pakistan, grossing over Rs. 1750 million in its first weekend, which was a record for any Indian film. It grossed Rs. 1012.5 million in India and Rs. 260.6 million overseas.

He acquired the Tamil and Telugu remake rights of 2016 Hindi film Pink. He produced the Tamil version of the film in 2019 as Nerkonda Paarvai, which became a critical and commercial success. Later in 2021, he produced the Telugu version of the film along with Dil Raju of Sri Venkateswara Creations as Vakeel Saab starring Pawan Kalyan, Anjali, Nivetha Thomas and Ananya Nagalla in lead roles. The film is the highest opener in India post the COVID-19 pandemic, netting over ₹38 crore on its first day. Both the films are his debut into Tamil and Telugu cinema respectively.

In 2023, he made his film debut in Tu Jhoothi Main Makkaar, playing the supporting role of Ranbir Kapoor's father.

Personal life
Kapoor was married to Mona Shourie from 1983 to 1996 and the couple have two children, Arjun Kapoor (born 1985) and Anshula (born in 1990). Arjun made his acting debut in the 2012 movie Ishaqzaade while Anshula graduated from Barnard College.

Kapoor married Indian actress Sridevi on 2 June 1996. The couple had two daughters, Janhvi Kapoor (born 6 March 1997) and Khushi Kapoor (born 5 November 2000). On 24 February 2018, Sridevi died in Dubai after drowning in her hotel bath tub. The Kapoor family of Prithviraj Kapoor are also his distant relatives as Prithviraj was Surinder's cousin.

Filmography

Acting

Awards and honours

References

External links
 
 

1955 births
Living people
Film producers from Mumbai
Hindi film producers
Indian film producers
Telugu film producers